Telephone numbers in Pakistan are ten digits long. Landline numbers and mobile numbers have different structures.  Geographically fixed landline are prefixed by an area code which varies in length depending on the significance of the place.  Mobile numbers are prefixed (03) followed by a code indicating the telephone operator. The international country code for Pakistan is '+92'.

Fixed (landline) numbers

Area codes in Pakistan are from two to five digits long; the smaller the city, the longer the prefix. All the large cities have two-digit codes.

Smaller towns have a six digit number. Large cities have seven digit numbers. Azad Jammu and Kashmir has five digit numbers. On 1 July 2009, telephone numbers in Karachi and Lahore were changed from seven digits to eight digits.  This was accomplished by adding the digit 9 to the beginning of any phone number that started with a 9 (government and semi-government connexions), and adding the digit 3 to any phone numbers that did not start with the number 9.

It is common to write phone numbers as (0xx) yyyyyyy, where xx is the area code. The 0 prefix is for trunk (long-distance) dialling from within the country. International callers should dial +92xxyyyyyyy

All mobile phone codes are four digits long and start with 03. All mobile numbers are seven digits long, and denote the mobile provider on a nationwide basis and not geographic location.  Thus all Telenor numbers (for example) nationwide carry mobile code 0345 etc.

NWD (area) codes for common cities are:

Premium Rate services:*0900 xxxxx

Toll free numbers (for callers within Pakistan):*0800 xxxxx

Mobile telephone numbers

Mobile telephone numbers in Pakistan are of the following format 03XZ-YYYYYYY where X is the single letter code assigned to a specific mobile telephone operator and Z-YYYYYYY is the local telephone number from any mobile phone or Land Line.

3 - is the Mobile Access code
Z can be any value between 0 and 9, assigned by the operator itself, except in case of SCOM where Z=5 only
X=0 Jazz Pakistan
X=1 Zong Pakistan
X=2 Jazz Pakistan
X=3 Ufone
X=4 Telenor Pakistan
X=5 SCOM (Z=5 only)
X=6 Instaphone

Existing Codes

300, 301, 302, 303, 304, 305, 306, 307, 308, 309 - Jazz Pakistan
310, 311, 312, 313, 314, 315, 316, 317, 318, 319 - Zong Pakistan
320, 321, 322, 323, 324, 325, 326, 327, 328, 329 - Jazz Pakistan
330, 331, 332, 333, 334, 335, 336, 337, 338, 339 - Ufone
340, 341, 342, 343, 344, 345, 346, 347, 348, 349 - Telenor Pakistan
355 - SCOM
364 - Instaphone

International callers must dial +92-3XZ-YYYYYYY to reach a mobile number in Pakistan from outside Pakistan, where '+92' is the Country Code, '3XZ' is Mobile Access Code as per the above list and 'YYYYYYY' is personal number.

Within Pakistan the same number can be reached by dialing either 03XZ-YYYYYYY or '0092-3XZ-YYYYYYY' or '+92-3XZ-YYYYYYY' from any mobile device or land line.

In order to dial a land line number from a mobile phone in Pakistan, city code is required in all cases. However, city code is not required between land line calls within the same city. For instance, to call a land line number 'YYYYYYY' from another land line in the same city, dial only 'YYYYYYY'. However, to call this number from another land line in another city or from a mobile phone anywhere (same city or another city), dial '(0XX)-YYYYYYY'.

References

ITU allocations list

External links
 National Dialing Codes
 Pakistan Telecommunications Authority - Pakistan’s telephone systems regulator

 
Pakistan
Telephone numbers